is a Japanese anime television series produced by Studio Junio. aired on TV Tokyo from October 1, 1996, to March 25, 1997. It is the first installment of the Saber Marionette franchise. The show was localized in North America by Ocean Productions and into six other languages by various companies.

In between production, Saber Marionette J spun off into other media. A manga serialized in Kadokawa Shoten's Dragon Age magazine ran from October 1996 to November 1999, and was collected into five volumes. A concurrent radio drama was broadcast and the show's original soundtrack was published by Kings Records. The show was also the basis for a PlayStation fighting game called Saber Marionette J: Battle Sabers, developed and published by Tom Create.

Plot
Otaru Mamiya is an 18-year-old day laborer living on his own in the fictional city state of Japoness. Employed as a fish peddler and running a morning's catch, he is hit by a car driven by Mitsurugi Hanagata, an acquaintance, spoiling his merchandise and sparking a fight the two agree to take elsewhere.

Traveling to a gully outside of the town, the boys continue their quarrel on a bridge where a skilled Otaru makes quick work of his opponent. In an unfortunate turn of events however, Otaru, balancing himself on a fence post which breaks off, is dumped into the river below where he is helplessly washed away.

Moments later, having drifted ashore in a small pond, Otaru finds himself at a rural athenaeum, the Japoness Pioneer Museum. He curiously explores the decrepit building, falling through a trapdoor and into a secret underground basement where he finds and awakens an encapsulated marionette. She introduces herself as Lime, embracing the dumbfounded boy with a laugh and revealing an unprecedented ability to express emotion.

Setting
The prologue of Saber Marionette J is set sometime into the 22nd century, when Earth's population has grown to such a magnitude that humanity cannot feasibly continue without colonizing space. The initial stages of the project make a promising effort of moving civilization into orbit, however it is during travel to a planet name Terra II that a transport vessel, the Mesopotamia, experiences a catastrophic fate, destroying all but a lone escape pod of people who plunge to the surface below. Of the handful of survivors however, only six males survive the crash, a ratio that both cripples their manpower and leaves them unable to reproduce.

Marooned and without communication, the men turn to genetic engineering as a method to produce clones of themselves, enough to populate the planet and sustain habitation. The effort is  critically fruitful, and over a course of three centuries, each of the survivors and their successors establish individual settlements in the form of six city-states.

In spite of the remarkable success however, notwithstanding even advancements in technology, Terra II remains uninhabited by women. An effort to substitute this absence is made with the manufacture of feminine androids name marionettes; creations that, while they serve their purpose, operate without sapience, emotion, or free will.

Themes
Saber Marionette J contains several groups of notable themes, mainly in the names of characters and locations. The focal heroines, Lime, Cherry, and Bloodberry, are named after fruits, while their counterparts, Tiger, Luchs, and Panther are named after animals, specifically of the family Felidae (using the German words and pronunciations for tiger, lynx, and panther due to their Galtland origins). Ieyasu Tokugawa, the fictional shogun of Japoness, derives his name and appearance from Tokugawa Ieyasu, while Gerhardt von Faust, führer of Galtland, is an allusion of Adolf Hitler whose name may be derived from Faust, a character of German folklore.

The city-states established by the male survivors are also based on the political and developmental histories and periods of countries. Japoness is a reminiscence of feudal Japan, Galtland portrays the totalitarian regime of Nazi Germany, Peterburg is structured after Soviet Russia, New Texas is representative of the modern United States, Xi'an paints the image of Imperial China and Romana takes after the Roman Empire. The letters that affix the titles of the franchise have also been explained to represent the city-state in which a particular series is set in. Saber Marionette R, for example, takes place in Romana while Saber Marionette J, occurs in Japoness.

Besides the show's botanic, animal and historic references, as well as its generally comedic overtones, Saber Marionette J briefly explores deeper motifs as well. One such motif, outspoken by Mitsurugi, is the discriminatory notion that marionettes are of no importance to humans beyond their menial labor, and should be disenfranchised to the affection or privileges of people. This idea becomes more recurrent later in the series when Otaru finds himself growing closer to the girls and questions himself for it. Another visited theme is the exploration of life, its senescence, and death. These truths have a major impact on the girls' developmental identity as they come to terms with themselves and humans.

Characters
Warranted by their unique ability to show mood and temperament, it is explained that each of the girls possess a heart-like technology, known as a maiden circuit, that empowers them with emotion. , the effeminate gay acquaintance who has a crush on Otaru and whose reckless driving more or less sets the premise of the show, also bands together with the group on their travels and as their neighbor when his mansion is burned down.

In a complementing fashion, each of these girls also possess maiden circuits.

Cast

Localization
Saber Marionette J was reproduced into seven languages through a joint cooperation of different companies. Bandai Entertainment announced on October 12, 2000 that it would be publishing the series on DVD, itself dubbed into English by Ocean Productions. Bandai went on to announce that the series would be released in a chronological fashion, succeeded by Saber Marionette J to X. Scheduled for release in February 2001, in addition to the standard Japanese and English dubs, Bandai announced around August 7, 2000 that the DVD releases would also contain Spanish; dubbed by Alebrije Entertainment, broadcast by Animax Latin America and Locomotion where it was also known by the name Chica Marioneta J.

Animax's branches in South Korea and Brazil also broadcast the series respectively in Korean and Portuguese, the latter having been produced by the São Paulo-based studio Master Sound where it was also known as Garotas Marionetes. Anime House, a company situated in Cologne, published the series in German; while Beez, the European off-shot of Bandai Visual, handled distribution in France.

Media

Manga
A few months before the release of the anime, a manga iteration of Saber Marionette J began to circulate in Kadokawa Shoten's Monthly Dragon Age written by series creator Satoru Akahori and illustrated by Yumisuke Kotoyoshi. The series ran from October 1996 to November 1999, being collected in five volumes by the company from January 1997 to December 1999. Besides its native release, Editora JBC, a Tokyo-based Portuguese publisher, announced on March 8, 2010 that it has secured the rights to the series.

In a similar fashion to the animated series, the Saber Marionette J manga was localized into other languages. Notably, Tokyopop announced in 2003 that it had acquired the publishing rights to the series and that the first volume would be released in July of that year. Madman Entertainment, an Australian publisher, additionally published the manga in Oceania from May 19, 2004 to March 5, 2005. Editorial Ivrea, an Argentina-based publishing company, published the series in Spanish.

Light novels
A total of 14 light novels were made about the series, written by Satoru Akahori and illustrated by Tsukasa Kotobuki. The books were printed by Fujimi Shobo between April 1995 and July 1, 1999.

Audio CDs
The complete soundtrack of Saber Marionette J was reproduced for distribution when the anime was still in production. The initial release, titled "Japones ginei shisyu sonoichi" (Japones Recitation Poem Collection 1)", was made on December 21, 1996 and contained 17 tracks by King Records. A sequel release, containing 24 tracks, was made on April 9, 1997.

Two audio dramas were made of the series. The first, released direct to commercial disc, was published from January 24 to May 22, 1995 as a four-disc set by King Records under their StarChild label, each containing 4 tracks with additional bonuses. These tracks would later be broadcast on October 21. The second audio drama was aired on TBS on Thursdays and was based on the aforementioned novels. Broadcasts were made from April 27 to July 3, 1997.

Game
Tom Create, a small Tokyo game developer, produced a fighting game of the series titled , published by Bandai Visual on March 28, 1997 for the PlayStation. Featuring Lime, Cherry, Bloodberry, the Saber Dolls, and a new marionette name Apple, the player is able to fight against a CPU or, with another controller, a second player. At the beginning of each round, player's are also allowed to choose two special abilities to buff their characters. The game featured an alternate version of the anime opening and was released in a limited and regular edition, the former bundled with figurines and special edition portraits of the characters.

Reception
Saber Marionette J was met with mostly positive reception. THEM Anime Reviews gave the series a 5 out of 5 stars, calling it "Top-notch animation, involving story and memorable characters make this one of the greats. If there was a flaw to be found here, it was too small to notice." Industry aggregator Mania.com editor Chris Beveridge rated each of the three North American releases a B, averaging a predictable story, an overall solid release, but that "Saber Marionette J was decent if unexceptional in total."

On Anime News Network, the show retains a median "Good" rating, averaging a 7 out of 10; the first VHS was also given a B+. Less favorable reviews criticized the cliche plot, character voices and less than crisp artwork. On Latin America the show turned a cult classic because of its airing on Locomotion and later Animax Latin America.

Footnotes
a.  Luchs name is derived from the German spelling and pronunciation for lynx.

References

Further reading

External links

1995 Japanese novels
1996 anime television series debuts
Bandai Entertainment anime titles
Fujimi Fantasia Bunko
Harem anime and manga
Kadokawa Shoten manga
Light novels
Romantic comedy anime and manga
Science fiction anime and manga
Shōnen manga
Tokyopop titles

ja:セイバーマリオネット